Indiana elected its member August 4, 1817.

See also 
 United States House of Representatives election in Indiana, 1816
 United States House of Representatives elections, 1816 and 1817
 List of United States representatives from Indiana

1817
Indiana
United States House of Representatives